Busby is a suburb of Sydney, in the state of New South Wales, Australia. Busby is located 37 kilometres south-west of the Sydney central business district, in the local government area of the City of Liverpool. Neighbouring suburbs include Miller, Heckenberg, Hinchinbrook, Green Valley and Bonnyrigg.

History
Busby was named after James Busby (1801–1871), a pioneer viticulturist, widely regarded as the father of the Australian wine industry. Busby, who arrived in Sydney from Scotland in 1824, was a teacher of Viticulture at the Male Orphans School at Bald Hills near Liverpool. The school closed in 1851.

He was the son of John Busby (1765–1857), the engineer who constructed Busby's Bore, Sydney's second water supply from Centennial Park to Hyde Park, Sydney.

Busby was part of the Green Valley housing estate, which was developed in the 1960s and 1970s.

Demographics
According to the 2016 census of population, there were 4,290 residents in Busby. 
 Aboriginal and Torres Strait Islander people made up 4.6% of the population.
 56.3% of people were born in Australia. The most common other countries of birth were Vietnam 5.9%, Lebanon 5.2%, Iraq 2.6%, Fiji 2.6% and New Zealand 2.0%. 
 42.9% of people only spoke English at home. Other languages spoken at home included Arabic 19.1%, Vietnamese 8.5%, Hindi 3.1%, Samoan 2.5% and Spanish 2.1%. 
 The most common responses for religion in Busby were Catholic 19.7%, Islam 19.5%, Not stated 13.4%, No Religion, so described 12.2% and Anglican 10.8%. In Busby, Christianity was the largest religious group reported overall (49.5%) (this figure excludes not stated responses).

Schools
Busby has two Primary Schools (Busby Public School and Busby West Public School) and a High School (James Busby High School).

Parks
Whitlam Park is named after former Australian Prime Minister Gough Whitlam.

References

The Book of Sydney Suburbs, Compiled by Frances Pollen, Angus & Robertson Publishers, 1990, Published in Australia 

Suburbs of Sydney
City of Liverpool (New South Wales)